Vasil Andoni (Elbasan, Ottoman Empire, January 28, 1901 - Rome, Italy, July 13, 1994) Albanian politician, teacher. He was the Secretary General and one of leaders the Balli Kombëtar active in World War II in Albania.

Biography
Vasil studied at Robert College in Constantinople, then took a job at the Elbasan Normal School in his hometown. He became a teacher at a high school in Tirana in 1939 and taught in Prishtina in the early 1940s.

In 1942, he joined the Nationalist National Front led by Midhat Frashëri and became its General Secretary. During the battles between the Communist-led National Liberation Movement and the National Front, he joined the National Front units fighting in the mountains of Central Albania in late 1943. Unlike many of his party counterparts, he opposed collaboration with German invaders.

Seeing the overwhelming advance of the Communist guerrilla brigades, along with other leaders of the National Front, Frashëri, Ali Këlcira and Hasan Dosti, they left for Shkodra on October 18, 1944, with a small fishing boat, and on October 23, they sailed south of Bris. He first settled in Rome and wrote for the anti-communist newspapers Albania libre ('Free Albania') and Flamuri ('The Flag'). He emigrated to New York in 1949, along with Midhat Frashëri, and until his death was a leading figure in the Albanian expatriate community in the United States. He never returned to his homeland.

Ideology
Vasil Andoni along with Abaz Ermenji, Zef Pali and Halil Maçi was part of the agrarian socialist and progressive wing of the party, which gained the leadership of the party after the war. He expressed himself as having "no religion" when he left Albania.

References

People from Elbasan
People from Manastir vilayet
Albanian atheists
1901 births
1994 deaths
Albanian nationalists
Balli Kombëtar
Albanian schoolteachers
Albanian expatriates in Italy